Nathan Furst (born July 4, 1978) is an American television and film composer.

Furst is the son of Lorraine (Wright) and actor Stephen Furst. Furst is the husband of Britlin Lee. Furst's first major film was the 1998 movie A Moment of Confusion. He then went on to compose music for other films such as the Bionicle trilogy (Bionicle: Mask of Light, Bionicle 2: Legends of Metru Nui and  Bionicle 3: Web of Shadows), Dust to Glory, Lake Placid 2, Lake Placid 3 and Act of Valor. Some of the television shows for which he has composed are The Real World and Max Steel. His more recent scores include Waiting for Lightning, Need for Speed, Cold Moon, and 6 Below: Miracle on the Mountain. He is a frequent collaborator with director Scott Waugh, having scored all of his films since Act of Valor.

After they remained unreleased for over a decade, Furst officially released his scores for the Bionicle films in 2017. Furst has described these scores as some of his best work due to the amount of creative freedom he was given.

Filmography

References

External links
 
 
Nathan Furst Interview at www.reviewgraveyard.com

1978 births
American film score composers
American male film score composers
Living people
Place of birth missing (living people)